Dinorwic, also spelled Dinorwig, is the anglicised form of the Welsh name Dinorwig, a village in Wales.

It may also refer to:

 Dinorwic quarry, a former slate quarry near Dinorwig, Wales
 Dinorwic, Ontario, a community in Canada
 Dinorwic (crater), a crater on Mars, named after the Canadian settlement

See also 
 Dinorwig Power Station, a pumped-storage hydroelectric powerstation near Dinorwig in Wales.